Shelburne is a locality in the Shire of Cook, Queensland, Australia.

Geography 
Parts of Shelburn are protected areas. In the north of the locality is the Heathlands Resources Reserve. In the east of the locality is the Wuthathi (Shelburne Bay) National Park and the Bromley (Ampulin) National Park. In the south of the locality is the Bromley (Kungkaychi) National Park.

History 
In 1976 the Australian Conservation Foundation first proposed the establishment of a national park to protect Shelburne Bays' white silica sand dunes. In 1987, a silica sand mining project in the area was rejected by Prime Minister Bob Hawke because of environmental concerns and the adverse impact on the Aboriginal community who had sacred sites in the area.

On 17 May 2017 the Queensland Government announced that  of land set aside in 1986 for the development of a spaceport would be returned to the Wuthathi, Kuuku Ya’u and Northern Kaanju people.   of the land would be used to establish Bromley (Ampulin) National and  used to establish Bromley (Kungkaychi) National Parks, both of which would be jointly managed by the Bromley Aboriginal Corporation and the Queensland Government.

References 

Shire of Cook
Coastline of Queensland
Localities in Queensland